William Bonsey (13 December 1845 – 13 January 1909)  was Archdeacon of Lancaster from 1905 to 1909.

Bonsey was educated at St John's College, Cambridge and ordained deacon in 1868 and priest in 1869. He held incumbencies in Corfe, Northaw and Lancaster. Later he was Proctor in Convocation for the Archdeaconry of Lancaster; Chaplain at Lancaster Castle; Chaplain to the Forces at Bowerham Barracks, Lancaster; Chaplain to the 2nd battalion of the King's Own Royal Lancaster Regiment; Rural Dean of Lancaster; and an Honorary Canon of Manchester Cathedral.

References

1845 births
Alumni of St John's College, Cambridge
Archdeacons of Lancaster
1909 deaths